The Insigne des blessés civils (Insignia for wounded civilians) is a French distinction for civilians, irrespective of age or sex, who have been injured or maimed as a result of war.

History
It was Maurice Barres, defender of the National Federation of the Disabled and President of the League of Patriots, to whom the idea of the creation of the Badge Wounded. In 1915, he launched a first call in the columns of the newspaper "L'Echo de Paris" on 28 March and another in the issue of June 10, for the creation of this distinctive insignia to designate the eyes of all "un homme dont les blessures, l'infirmité, la maladie proviennent d'un fait de guerre (a man whose injury, disability, illness comes from an act of war)".

On July 18, 1918, a decree made at the initiative of Minister of the Interior, which instituted a lapel pin for civilian victims of war. This award is presented:

for World War I 1914-1918, by order of the Minister of Interior after consulting a board meeting at Head of the department of residence of the candidate. 
for World War II 1939-1945, by the Minister of Veterans and War Victims, the candidate must be a pensioner or civilian casualties of war.

La Grande Chancellerie de la Légion d'honneur does not recognize this medal, or the military version, as an official decoration, therefore it is not mentioned on any order of precedence list.  However, in view of the importance it can have many of its owners, it is widely worn.

Description of the Medal
Currently, the most commonly worn medal is uniface of gilt bronze, 30 mm in diameter and consists of a white enamel star encircled by a wreath of oak and laurel leaves. The medal is hangs from a ribbon of blue and yellow.  When the ribbon bar is worn alone it containts a white star clasp.

See also
 Ribbons of the French military and civil awards
 List of wound decorations

References
 https://web.archive.org/web/20100419062824/http://www.france-phaleristique.com/blesinsigns.htm

Civil awards and decorations of France
Military awards and decorations of France
Wound decorations